Gopal Singh Rawat was an Indian politician from Bharatiya Janata Party. Rawat was elected as a member of the Uttarakhand Legislative Assembly from Gangotri (constituency) in 2007 and 2017. Rawat defeated Vijaypal Singh Sajwan of Indian National Congress by 9,610 votes in 2017 Uttarakhand Assembly election. Rawat died from Cancer aged 60.

References 

Living people
Year of birth missing (living people)
21st-century Indian politicians
People from Uttarkashi district
Bharatiya Janata Party politicians from Uttarakhand
Uttarakhand MLAs 2017–2022
Uttarakhand MLAs 2007–2012